Weaver v. Palmer Brothers Company, 270 U.S. 402 (1926), was a United States Supreme Court case in which the Court struck down a public health and safety regulation as a violation of due process under the Fourteenth Amendment.

Background 
A statute banned the use of cut up fabrics in the manufacturing of bedding based on concerns over public health.  The statute did allow for the use of other second hand fabrics after sterilization.

Opinion of the Court 
Because the banned cut up fabrics could be rendered safe by the same process of sterilization, the Court held the statute to be an arbitrary infringement on business that violated the due process clause of the Fourteenth Amendment.

References

External links
 

United States Supreme Court cases
United States Supreme Court cases of the Taft Court
1926 in United States case law
United States due process case law